Richard Garner Moore Jr. is a United States Air Force lieutenant general who has served as deputy chief of staff for plans and programs of the U.S. Air Force since July 2022. He previously served as director of programs of the U.S. Air Force.

In May 2022, Moore was nominated for promotion to lieutenant general and appointment as deputy chief of staff for plans and programs of the United States Air Force.

References

 

Living people
Place of birth missing (living people)
Recipients of the Legion of Merit
United States Air Force generals
United States Air Force personnel of the Iraq War
Year of birth missing (living people)